The Butte store is the only structure still standing of the original mining town of Butte City. It used to be one of 100 buildings. It was built in 1857 by Enrico Bruni, an Italian stonemason.  It is made of brick and fieldstone from Calaveras. It also has three doors made of iron. Xavier Benoist used it as a store and bakery. The building served as a post office. It was also a general store called Ginocchio's. The Ginnochio family owned it for 50 years. It closed in the 1900s. It is a California Historical Landmark.

References

Unincorporated communities in California
Unincorporated communities in Amador County, California
1857 establishments in California